Beach handball competition at the 2016 Asian Beach Games was held in Da Nang, Vietnam from 25 September to 2 October 2016 at My Khe Beach.

Medalists

Medal table

Results

Men

Preliminary

Group A

|-
|25 Sep
|10:00
|align=right|
|align=center|2–1
|align=left|
|17–14||12–20||7–4
|-
|25 Sep
|16:00
|align=right|
|align=center|2–0
|align=left|
|27–16||20–19||
|-
|26 Sep
|10:00
|align=right|
|align=center|0–2
|align=left|
|14–31||15–32||
|-
|26 Sep
|16:00
|align=right|
|align=center|2–1
|align=left|
|18–19||21–16||9–6
|-
|27 Sep
|10:45
|align=right|
|align=center|2–0
|align=left|
|28–18||17–14||
|-
|27 Sep
|16:45
|align=right|
|align=center|2–0
|align=left|
|23–15||17–14||
|-
|28 Sep
|10:00
|align=right|
|align=center|0–2
|align=left|
|20–24||14–26||
|-
|28 Sep
|16:00
|align=right|
|align=center|1–2
|align=left|
|17–16||18–22||6–9
|-
|29 Sep
|10:00
|align=right|
|align=center|2–0
|align=left|
|29–24||26–18||
|-
|29 Sep
|16:00
|align=right|
|align=center|2–0
|align=left|
|14–11||19–12||
|}

Group B

|-
|25 Sep
|10:45
|align=right|
|align=center|1–2
|align=left|
|17–12||11–17||4–5
|-
|25 Sep
|16:45
|align=right|
|align=center|2–0
|align=left|
|18–11||21–10||
|-
|25 Sep
|17:30
|align=right|
|align=center|2–0
|align=left|
|32–17||19–8||
|-
|26 Sep
|10:45
|align=right|
|align=center|2–0
|align=left|
|19–9||22–14||
|-
|26 Sep
|11:30
|align=right|
|align=center|1–2
|align=left|
|14–25||17–16||6–8
|-
|26 Sep
|16:45
|align=right|
|align=center|2–0
|align=left|
|25–14||26–7||
|-
|27 Sep
|10:00
|align=right|
|align=center|2–0
|align=left|
|18–16||16–15||
|-
|27 Sep
|10:45
|align=right|
|align=center|0–2
|align=left|
|10–26||9–34||
|-
|27 Sep
|17:30
|align=right|
|align=center|2–0
|align=left|
|21–13||22–20||
|-
|28 Sep
|10:45
|align=right|
|align=center|0–2
|align=left|
|11–22||7–25||
|-
|28 Sep
|16:00
|align=right|
|align=center|2–0
|align=left|
|20–19||17–11||
|-
|28 Sep
|17:30
|align=right|
|align=center|2–1
|align=left|
|18–19||25–22||7–6
|-
|29 Sep
|10:00
|align=right|
|align=center|0–2
|align=left|
|19–24||17–20||
|-
|29 Sep
|16:00
|align=right|
|align=center|2–0
|align=left|
|18–17||25–22||
|-
|29 Sep
|17:30
|align=right|
|align=center|0–2
|align=left|
|15–16||12–16||
|}

Classification 9th–11th

Semifinals

|-
|30 Sep
|16:00
|align=right|
|align=center|1–2
|align=left|
|21–19||20–23||8–10
|}

Classification 9th–10th

|-
|01 Oct
|10:45
|align=right|
|align=center|0–2
|align=left|
|11–26||15–22||
|}

Classification 5th–8th

Semifinals

|-
|30 Sep
|16:45
|align=right|
|align=center|2–0
|align=left|
|26–18||16–6||
|-
|30 Sep
|17:30
|align=right|
|align=center|2–1
|align=left|
|18–24||23–22||7–3
|}

Classification 7th–8th

|-
|01 Oct
|11:30
|align=right|
|align=center|0–2
|align=left|
|13–25||17–29||
|}

Classification 5th–6th

|-
|01 Oct
|16:00
|align=right|
|align=center|2–0
|align=left|
|20–18||13–12||
|}

Final round

Semifinals

|-
|01 Oct
|15:45
|align=right|
|align=center|2–0
|align=left|
|20–10||24–18||
|-
|01 Oct
|17:15
|align=right|
|align=center|2–1
|align=left|
|22–21||16–19||7–4
|}

Bronze medal match

|-
|02 Oct
|15:45
|align=right|
|align=center|1–2
|align=left|
|24–20||17–20||8–10
|}

Gold medal match

|-
|02 Oct
|17:15
|align=right|
|align=center|2–1
|align=left|
|23–22||22–24||6–2
|}

Women

Preliminary

Group A

|-
|25 Sep
|16:45
|align=right|
|align=center|0–2
|align=left|
|15–20||7–20||
|-
|26 Sep
|10:00
|align=right|
|align=center|0–2
|align=left|
|16–17||18–19||
|-
|26 Sep
|17:30
|align=right|
|align=center|0–2
|align=left|
|6–20||16–19||
|-
|27 Sep
|16:00
|align=right|
|align=center|2–0
|align=left|
|17–16||12–10||
|-
|28 Sep
|16:45
|align=right|
|align=center|0–2
|align=left|
|10–18||10–17||
|-
|29 Sep
|16:45
|align=right|
|align=center|2–1
|align=left|
|23–12||18–20||7–4
|}

Group B

|-
|25 Sep
|10:45
|align=right|
|align=center|0–2
|align=left|
|8–22||10–19||
|-
|25 Sep
|16:00
|align=right|
|align=center|0–2
|align=left|
|12–25||5–16||
|-
|26 Sep
|10:45
|align=right|
|align=center|0–2
|align=left|
|9–11||16–22||
|-
|26 Sep
|16:00
|align=right|
|align=center|0–2
|align=left|
|11–30||9–18||
|-
|27 Sep
|16:00
|align=right|
|align=center|2–0
|align=left|
|18–6||19–13||
|-
|27 Sep
|16:45
|align=right|
|align=center|0–2
|align=left|
|5–18||12–15||
|-
|28 Sep
|10:45
|align=right|
|align=center|0–2
|align=left|
|12–19||13–18||
|-
|28 Sep
|16:45
|align=right|
|align=center|1–2
|align=left|
|16–12||8–17||4–7
|-
|29 Sep
|15:15
|align=right|
|align=center|1–2
|align=left|
|16–13||14–15||6–7
|-
|29 Sep
|16:45
|align=right|
|align=center|0–2
|align=left|
|5–21||6–24||
|}

Classification 5th–8th

Semifinals

|-
|30 Sep
|16:00
|align=right|
|align=center|2–0
|align=left|
|13–12||17–16||
|-
|30 Sep
|16:45
|align=right|
|align=center|0–2
|align=left|
|14–19||16–23||
|}

Classification 7th–8th

|-
|01 Oct
|10:45
|align=right|
|align=center|0–2
|align=left|
|16–24||9–20||
|}

Classification 5th–6th

|-
|01 Oct
|11:30
|align=right|
|align=center|2–0
|align=left|
|10–8||11–10||
|}

Final round

Semifinals

|-
|01 Oct
|15:00
|align=right|
|align=center|2–0
|align=left|
|17–13||22–20||
|-
|01 Oct
|16:30
|align=right|
|align=center|2–0
|align=left|
|23–20||22–15||
|}

Bronze medal match

|-
|02 Oct
|15:00
|align=right|
|align=center|2–0
|align=left|
|24–23||21–11||
|}

Gold medal match

|-
|02 Oct
|16:30
|align=right|
|align=center|2–1
|align=left|
|20–13||16–17||7–6
|}

References

External links
Official Result Book – Beach Handball

2016 Asian Beach Games events
Asian Beach Games
2016